Nebraska Highway 22 is a highway in central Nebraska. Its western terminus is at Nebraska Highway 70 south of Ord. Its eastern terminus is at U.S. Highway 81 northwest of Columbus.

Route description
Nebraska Highway 22 begins at Nebraska Highway 70 south of Ord in rural Valley County, heading east into farmland. Near Scotia, it turns east and goes through Scotia before meeting U.S. Highway 281. The two highways are paired together and separate near Wolbach. It goes east through Wolbach and continues east until it meets Nebraska Highway 14 in Fullerton. NE 22 and NE 14 go north out of Fullerton and separate. NE 22 then goes east on an alignment which parallels the Loup River on its north side. It passes through Genoa and Monroe before ending at U.S. Highway 81 near Columbus.

Major intersections

References

External links

The Nebraska Highways Page: Highways 1 to 30
Nebraska Roads: NE 21-40

022
Transportation in Valley County, Nebraska
Transportation in Greeley County, Nebraska
Transportation in Howard County, Nebraska
Transportation in Merrick County, Nebraska
Transportation in Nance County, Nebraska
Transportation in Platte County, Nebraska